The 2004–05 Scottish Cup was the 120th season of Scotland's most prestigious football knockout competition, also known for sponsorship reasons as the Tennent's Scottish Cup. The Cup was won by Celtic, who defeated Dundee United 1–0 in the final; this was Martin O'Neill's last match as Celtic manager.

Calendar

First round

Second round

Replays

Third round

Replays

Fourth round

Replays

Quarter-finals

Semi-finals

Final

Scottish Cup seasons
Scottish Cup, 2004-05
Scot